Bonekickers is a BBC drama about a team of archaeologists, set at the fictional Wessex University. It made its début on 8 July 2008 and ran for one series.

It was written by Life on Mars and Ashes to Ashes creators Matthew Graham and Ashley Pharoah. It was produced by Michele Buck and Damien Timmer of Mammoth Screen Ltd and co-produced with Monastic Productions.  Archaeologist and Bristol University academic Mark Horton acted as the series' archaeological consultant. Adrian Lester has described the programme as "CSI meets Indiana Jones [...] There's an element of the crime procedural show, there's science, conspiracy theories—and there's a big underlying mystery that goes through the whole six-episode series."

Much of the series was filmed in the City of Bath, Somerset, with locations including the University of Bath campus (which does not offer Archaeology courses). Additional locations included Brean Down Fort and Kings Weston House (both for episode 2), Chavenage House for episodes 5 & 6 and Sheldon Manor.

On 21 November 2008 Broadcast magazine revealed the show would not be returning for a second series.

Characters
 Dr Gillian Magwilde – the team's head archaeologist, played by Julie Graham. Magwilde, a powerful, confident woman, is not afraid to take charge. When it comes to her relationship with the team she is less domineering, and goes with her instincts. Her attitude to Viv is a little waspish but as time progresses, she sees a lot of herself in Viv which is why she pushes her so hard.
 Vivienne "Viv" Davis – young and promising archaeologist, played by Gugu Mbatha-Raw. Her eagerness to work and learn always seem to be checked by Dr Magwilde. Her potential is flourishing and her capabilities are equal to any of her teammates. The only thing holding her back is experience, the one thing that she is forced to gain fast.
 Dr Ben Ergha – a young, established archaeologist, played by Adrian Lester. He is more welcoming of Viv compared to the others, and is the only one prepared to help her fit in. As a prominent character, much of the plot is seen through his eyes.
 Professor Gregory "Dolly" Parton – the experienced and older male archaeologist, played by Hugh Bonneville. Parton is the voice of wisdom and insight. At times he keeps to himself while working, but gets involved when needed. Parton is highly respected, laid-back and valued member of the team who will step in to focus the group in important situations.
 Professor Daniel Mastiff – played by Michael Maloney.

Episode guide

Reception

Ratings 
According to unofficial figures, the first episode of the series was watched by 6.8 million viewers, achieving a 31% audience share. This fell to 5.2 million viewers with a 24.3% share in the second week, and 4.6 million with a 21% share in the third. And week four fell again to 4.2 million, a 20% share. Week five dropped to 3.8 million. The final episode saw a slight increase in viewers to 4.3 million.

First night reviews
The series debuted to broadly negative reviews.  The Guardians Gareth McLean described the show as "mind-bogglingly dreadful", with "lame characters delivering abysmal lines", David Chater of The Times thought it "rubbish", and The Independents Thomas Sutcliffe found it laughable and full of absurdities, while also observing that "Professor Magwilde's approach to archaeology is unconventional. She likes to squat at the edge of the trench and mutter urgently, 'Come on! Give up your secrets!'" In BBC Two's Newsnight Review, the author Kate Mosse asserted it would be "great for teenagers", while the academic and critic Sarah Churchwell said the  "execution [was] appalling" and that it was "beyond silly"; John Mullan likewise criticised the show's absurdities, saying that "Hokum has to have its own logic". The New Statesman described it as "dramatic goo". Some reviews were slightly more positive - Patricia Wynn Davies of The Telegraph wrote that while lacking in subtlety, the episode had an "action-packed conclusion", and Lucy Mangan in the Guardian criticised the episode as "arrant nonsense" and "a clattering bag of madness" and found its characters too "shouty", but praised Paul Rhys and overall concluded that the episode was "utterly bonkers but curiously satisfying" and that, as for the series, "keeping the faith for a few more weeks might well pay off".

Academic reception
In line with the broadly negative reviews, the reception amongst the academic community was mixed, with different complaints around technical accuracy. Mark Horton, the academic advisor to the script, answered criticisms on the BRITARCH e-mail list.

Viewer complaints
A scene in the first episode which depicted a Muslim's beheading by an extremist Christian drew 100 complaints.  The BBC expressed "regret" that some viewers had found the scene "inappropriate", but defended the decision to show it.

See also
 Bones (TV series)
 Relic Hunter
 Veritas: The Quest

References

External links
 

University of Bath Archaeology Department - Set up for Bonekickers
Ephemera: Archaeology on Television - watch this short film by Sean Caveille about the portrayal of archaeology on TV

BBC television dramas
BBC high definition shows
Archaeology in popular culture
Fictional archaeologists
Treasure hunt television series
2008 British television series debuts
2008 British television series endings
2000s British drama television series
2000s British television miniseries
Television series by Mammoth Screen
English-language television shows
Television shows set in Somerset
Television shows set in Bristol
Television shows set in Gloucestershire
Television shows set in England